Priestville is a designated place within Pictou County in Nova Scotia, Canada near New Glasgow and the Trans-Canada Highway.

Demographics 

References

Communities in Pictou County
Designated places in Nova Scotia